The winter of 1981–1982 in the United Kingdom (also called  The Big Snow of 1982 by the press) was a severe cold wave that was formed in early December 1981 and lasted until mid-late January in 1982, and was one of the coldest Decembers recorded in the United Kingdom.

At the end of November 1981, a strong high-pressure anticyclone over southern England was keeping temperatures around the average for the time of year. Numerous strong low-pressure extratropical cyclones passing to the north of Scotland dragged cold upper-level air down from the Arctic, but the anticyclone to the south of the United Kingdom deflected the coldest air away from the British Isles. On 23 November 1981, a cold front crossing the United Kingdom, fuelled by humid subtropical air from the south colliding with this colder Arctic air from the north, spawned 104 tornadoes as part of a record-breaking nationwide tornado outbreak. Following the passing of the cold front, the anticyclone to the south began to break down, allowing the colder Arctic air to move in over Britain and Ireland from the north and precipitating the start of the severe cold wave at the start of December.

The coldest temperature recorded in December was  recorded in Shawbury, Shropshire on the 13th, and is the coldest December temperature recorded in England. Wales also recorded its coldest recorded December temperature during the cold wave, with a temperature of  recorded at Corwen, Denbighshire also on the 13th.

The coldest temperature recorded in the United Kingdom during the cold wave was recorded in Scotland with a temperature of  recorded in Braemar, Aberdeenshire on 10 January, and is the coldest temperature ever recorded in the United Kingdom.

References

1981 cold waves
1982 cold waves
Cold wave
Cold wave
Cold wave
Cold wave
Cold waves in the United Kingdom
1981 disasters in the United Kingdom
1982 disasters in the United Kingdom